LFMR may refer to:

 Landfill Mining and Reclamation
 Low field magnetoresistance
 The ICAO code for  Barcelonnette – Saint-Pons Airport in France.